Ambulyx ceramensis is a species of moth in the family Sphingidae. It was described by James John Joicey and George Talbot in 1921 and is known from Indonesia.

References

Ambulyx
Moths described in 1921
Moths of Indonesia